Parte de Mí is the second studio album by Argentine rapper Nicki Nicole. It was released on October 28, 2021, through Dale Play Records and Sony Music Latin. The album features the collaborations of artists such as Rauw Alejandro, Mon Laferte, Dread Mar I, Bizarrap, Mora, Trueno, Delaossa, Ptazeta, Snow Tha Product and Tiago PZK.

Release and cover
The album was released on October 28, 2021, this is the first debut with the Sony Music Latin record label. The cover of Parte de Mí is a puzzle-based design; "I think the cover is a good representation of human beings, showing that we are all the sum of fragments, cuts, parts. We liked to play with the idea of a puzzle to show that it is in any order, we are all the total of various little things that complete us and make us who we are", explained the singer.

Reception

Review

Julyssa Lopez of the American edition for the Rolling Stone magazine gave it a 3.5/5 star rating. For his part, Emilio Zavaley, from Rolling Stone (Argentina), like the magazine's US edition rating, gave it a 3.5/5-star rating; and in evaluating him, he commented that "Nicki is not limited only to which markets she aims to conquer, she also seeks to develop in sounds outside of what she has shown so far". Billboard described in his evaluation: "Parte de Mí shows not only Nicki's powerful soulful voice, but also her agility to navigate between genres, such as hip hop, reggaeton, ballads and even disco-pop". Parte de Mí was ranked at number 33 in the list for "The 35 Best Spanish-Language and Bilingual Albums of 2021" by the American magazine Rolling Stone.

Commercial performance
After its release, the album debuted in second position on Spotify's Top 10 Album Debuts Global chart, behind only of = by Ed Sheeran; and at number 9 on the Top 10 USA Album Debuts, respectively.

In Spain, the album entered at number 34 on the PROMUSICAE chart on November 3, 2021, and reached a new peak at number 12 the following week.

Promotion

Singles
The singer released "Colocao" on May 14, 2020, as the first single from the album, which represented her first contribution to Sony Music Latin. The song reached position #6 on the Argentina Hot 100 chart and was its first entry on the Spanish chart, where it peaked at number #48. In addition, she received a gold Latin record in US by Recording Industry Association of America (RIAA) and gold Mexico, a platinum record in Spain and a double platinum record in Argentina. Her music video was filmed by Nicki Nicole herself with the help of her brothers at her home during the quarantine, due to the COVID-19 pandemic, in Buenos Aires and was directed by Jessica Praznik from a distance.

The second single from the album, "Mala Vida," was released on September 5, 2020. From a commercial point of view, it obtained a positive response although it only managed to enter the lists of two countries, Argentina and Spain. The music video was a tribute to The Godfather; In Nicki's words: "Mala Vida arose after seeing The Godfather saga, I had never seen it and in three nights together with my producers we saw it in its entirety. From there I was born a lot of inspiration, to create something with a mafia style, but with my ideas. This is how ‘Mala Vida’ came about and with an incredible video it was perfectly captured. I always wanted to make a video based on a trailer and The Godfather and Italian culture was the trigger and my inspiration". "Verte," featuring Argentine singer Dread Mar I and Argentine producer Bizarrap, was released as the third single from the album on December 10, 2020. The song shows a new facet of the three musicians through a fusion between reggae, pop and rap. This reached its maximum peak in the Argentina Hot 100 the following year, placing it in position #14.

Tour
The album was promoted on Parte de Mí Tour, Nicki Nicole's first international projection tour. The tour will start in Rosario, Santa Fe, the artist's birthplace, on November 27 and 29 at the Teatro Broadway, given the success and the consequent sold out of the first date, while on the 28th of the same month she will be at the Quality Espacio from Córdoba.
In addition, on December 3 she will be presented at the Teatro Gran Rex in the City of Buenos Aires, where it also sold out in a matter of hours and added a new day for the following day.

Track listing
All the songs were written by Nicki Nicole.

Personnel
Credits adapted from Genius.

Primary artist
 Nicki Nicole – vocals, songwriter, composer

Additional musicians
 Rauw Alejandro – featured vocals, songwriter 
 Mon Laferte – featured vocals, songwriter 
 Dread Mar I – featured vocals, songwriter 
 Mora – featured vocals, songwriter, bass, drums 
 Trueno – featured vocals, songwriter 
 Delaossa – featured vocals, songwriter 
 Ptazeta – featured vocals, songwriter 
 Snow Tha Product – featured vocals, songwriter 
 Tiago PZK – featured vocals, songwriter 
 Ayelen Zucker – backing vocals
 Camila Ibarra – backing vocals
 Alex Introini – bass, keyboards
 Caleb Calloway – bass, drums, keyboards, songwriter
 Evlay – bass, drums, guitar, keyboards, percussion, synth songwriter
 Juan Giménez Kuj – bass
 Agustín Piva – drums
 Bizarrap – drums, keyboards, songwriter
 Mauro de Tommaso – drums, guitar, keyboards, songwriter
 Nicolás Taranto – drums
 Gonzalo Hermida – guitar
 Leonardo Andersen – guitar
 Pedro Pasquale – guitar
 Kiddo Manteca – keyboards, percussion, songwriter
 Richi López – keyboards, songwriter
 Tatool – keyboards, songwriter
 Julio Reyes – piano, songwriter
 Eric Duars – songwriter
 Kenobi Sensei – songwriter
 Machaelo Angelo Cole Garrido – songwriter

Additional personnel
 Mauro de Tommaso – producer, mixing, recording engineer
 Evlay – producer, mixing, recording engineer
 Bizarrap – producer, recording engineer
 Caleb Calloway – producer
 Mora –  producer
 Kiddo Manteca – producer, recording engineer
 Machaelo Angelo Cole Garrido – producer, mixing, recording engineer
 Julio Reyes – producer, recording engineer
 Richi López – producer, recording engineer
 Tatool – producer, recording engineer
 Felipe Trujillo Guerra – assistant engineer
 Javier Fracchia – mastering
 Nico Cotton – mixing
 Piklet – mixing
 Andrés Elijovich – arranger
 Axel Introini – recording engineer
 Joel Orta – recording engineer
 Juan Giménez Kuj – recording engineer
 Kenobi Sensei – recording engineer

Charts

Release history

References

2021 albums
Nicki Nicole albums
Spanish-language albums
Latin pop albums
Latin trap albums
Reggaeton albums
Sony Music Latin albums